Richard George MacLeish (January 3, 1950 – May 30, 2016) was a Canadian professional ice hockey forward who played 14 seasons in the National Hockey League (NHL) with the Philadelphia Flyers, Hartford Whalers, Pittsburgh Penguins, and Detroit Red Wings. He played 12 seasons in Philadelphia, winning the Stanley Cup twice with the Flyers in 1974 and 1975.

Playing career
MacLeish played minor ice hockey in Cannington, Ontario, and went to the 1962 Quebec International Pee-Wee Hockey Tournament with his youth team. He played junior ice hockey with the Peterborough Petes from 1967 to 1970. The Boston Bruins selected him fourth overall in the 1970 NHL Amateur Draft. After spending the first half of his first professional season with the Oklahoma City Blazers, MacLeish was involved in a three-way deal which sent him; Bruce Gamble, Dan Schock, and a 1st round pick to the Philadelphia Flyers, Bernie Parent and a 2nd round pick to the Toronto Maple Leafs, and Mike Walton to Boston. MacLeish spent the rest of the 1970–71 season with the Flyers, scoring two goals and four assists in 26 games. He also added a goal in four playoff games.  In the 1971–72 season he saw his output drop considerably to a single goal, and consequently split the year between the Flyers and their AHL affiliate the Richmond Robins.

The 1972–73 season, during which the Flyers earned the nickname "the Broad Street Bullies" proved to be a breakout year for MacLeish as he became the first member of the Flyers to ever score 50 goals in a single campaign.  He added 50 assists that year, to bring his points total to 100.  This was enough to finish fourth in league scoring, only a single point behind Bobby Orr.  In the Stanley Cup playoffs, the Flyers won their first playoff series against the Minnesota North Stars and faced the heavily favored Montreal Canadiens in the semi final round.  MacLeish and the Flyers stunned the Canadiens winning the opening game in Montreal when the Flyers' center intercepted an errant Frank Mahovlich pass (Mahovlich lost the puck in a legendary "puddle of water" on the ice) and scored in overtime.  The Flyers pushed the Canadiens into overtime in game 2 as well, but, would lose that game 4–3 and would go on to lose the series 4 games to one.

In the 1973–74 season, MacLeish's regular season scoring dropped slightly, as he scored 32 goals and added 45 assists.  In the playoffs, however, he led all scorers with 13 goals and 9 assists as the Flyers claimed their first ever Stanley Cup.  He scored the only goal in the series' sixth and final game, and narrowly missed out on winning the Conn Smythe Trophy to his teammate, Bernie Parent.

After another successful regular season in 1974–75, notching 38 goals and 41 assists MacLeish went on to lead his team again in playoff scoring as they won a second consecutive championship.  This championship marked the last time the trophy was raised by a team consisting solely of Canadian born players. MacLeish's 1975–76 season was marred by injury, as he only played in 51 games.  He managed to accumulate 22 goals and 23 assists in the regular season, but,  was unable to play in the playoffs, which saw the Flyers swept in four games by the Montreal Canadiens.

The following year saw MacLeish lead the Flyers in scoring for the first time in his career, tallying 49 goals and 48 assists.   It also was the first year in which he earned an invitation to the NHL All-Star Game, a feat which he duplicated the following year. In a game against the Los Angeles Kings in April 1978, MacLeish narrowly avoided serious injury suffering a cut neck requiring 80 stitches when he slid into the skate of center Marcel Dionne.  Several days later, he was back in the lineup. He joked later that he smoked a cigarette in the locker room afterward and smoke came out his throat.

After the 1980–81 season, the Flyers traded MacLeish, Blake Wesley, and Don Gillen to the Hartford Whalers for Fred Arthur and Ray Allison. During the 1981–82 season, the Whalers traded MacLeish to the Pittsburgh Penguins for Russ Anderson. Pittsburgh released MacLeish during the 1982–83 season, and he played briefly in Switzerland. He rejoined the Flyers as a free agent for the 1983–84 season, and was traded during the season to the Detroit Red Wings for future considerations. He retired at the end of that season.

Playing style
His skating and playing styles were influenced by years of "river skating" where he developed his smooth, long striding speed.  MacLeish depended on a whipping and accurate wrist shot for the majority of his goals and was the Flyers' first, pure goal scoring "sniper".  His often used scoring move involved carrying the puck over the blue line, quickly darting to the left and then wrist shooting the puck back to the right against the goaltender.

Later life
In retirement, MacLeish enjoyed his passion for owning racehorses. In the early 2000s, he suffered a heart attack during a Flyers Alumni game and had cardiac bypass surgery the next day.  MacLeish also suffered from diabetes. On May 11, 2016, MacLeish's daughter announced her father had been "battling multiple medical problems" for the last 6 weeks in a Philadelphia hospital. MacLeish died in the Philadelphia hospital where he was being treated on May 30, 2016 at age 66 of meningitis, as well as kidney and liver failure. MacLeish was survived by his wife, Charlene, and two daughters, Brianna and Danielle.

Tribute
Upon learning of MacLeish's death, Philadelphia Flyers' team president Paul Holmgren issued the following statement on the club's Instagram account: “With the passing of Rick MacLeish, the Flyers have lost one of their legends.  A good father, grandfather, teammate and friend, Rick will be missed by all who were fortunate to come and know him over the years. His happy and friendly demeanor was front and center everywhere Rick went."

Career statistics

References

External links
 

1950 births
2016 deaths
Boston Bruins draft picks
Canadian ice hockey centres
Canadian people of Scottish descent
Detroit Red Wings players
Hartford Whalers players
EHC Kloten players
London Nationals players
National Hockey League All-Stars
National Hockey League first-round draft picks
Oklahoma City Blazers (1965–1977) players
Peterborough Petes (ice hockey) players
Philadelphia Flyers players
Pittsburgh Penguins players
Richmond Robins players
Stanley Cup champions
Canadian expatriate ice hockey players in Switzerland
Canadian expatriate ice hockey players in the United States
Deaths from liver failure
Deaths from kidney failure
Ice hockey people from Ontario